Xenopsylla gratiosa is a flea found on seabirds including the European storm petrel. Along with dermanyssid mites, these blood-sucking parasites slow the growth rate of nestlings and may affect their survival rate.

References

Pulicidae
Insects of Europe
Parasites of birds